Thatch palm is a common name for several different species of palm trees that are used for thatching, and may refer to:

Coccothrinax, many species native to the Caribbean
Howea, two species native to Lord Howe Island, Australia
Thrinax, three species native to the Caribbean
Cocos nucifera, the coconut tree, used in Makuti thatching

Arecaceae